The Treaty of Baden ended formal hostilities between Kingdom of France and the Holy Roman Empire, which had been at war since the start of the War of the Spanish Succession. The treaty was signed on 7 September 1714 in Baden, Switzerland, and complemented the Treaties of Utrecht and Rastatt.

The Treaty of Rastatt had Emperor Charles VI accept the Treaty of Utrecht on behalf of the Habsburg monarchy. In the Treaty of Baden, terms of peace between France and the Holy Roman Empire, which had been formally incomplete, were agreed, which ended the last of the many conflicts of the War of the Spanish Succession.

Details of the Treaty of Baden and the peace conference are recalled by the town's banneret and eyewitness, Caspar Joseph Dorer (1673-1754), in his "Diarium".

The treaty was the first international agreement signed in the Swiss Confederacy. On the margins of the conference, the signatories also secretly agreed to a Catholic union to intervene in favour of the Catholic cantons that had been defeated at the Second War of Villmergen two years earlier by the Peace of Aarau ending Catholic hegemony in the Confederacy.

Terms
 France retained Alsace and Landau but returned the east bank of the Rhine River (the Breisgau) to Austria.
 The prince-electors of Bavaria and Cologne were reinstated in their territories and their positions.
 Emperor Charles VI kept the title of King of Spain and the Spanish heritage, which was actually of no value since in Spain, all power remained with King Philip V of Spain.

References

External links
 
 
 

War of the Spanish Succession
1714 in Austria
1714 in France
Baden
Baden 1714
Baden 1714
Baden, Switzerland
1714 in the Holy Roman Empire